Kraków, is the second-largest and one of the oldest cities in Poland. Situated on the Vistula River in Lesser Poland Voivodeship, the city dates back to the seventh century. Kraków was the official capital of Poland until 1596 and has traditionally been one of the leading centres of Polish academic, economic, cultural and artistic life. Cited as one of Europe's most beautiful cities, its Old Town with Wawel Royal Castle was declared a UNESCO World Heritage Site in 1978, one of the world's first sites granted the status.

The city has grown from a Stone Age settlement to Poland's second-most-important city. It began as a hamlet on Wawel Hill and was reported by Ibrahim Ibn Yakoub, a merchant from Cordoba, as a busy trading centre of Central Europe in 985. With the establishment of new universities and cultural venues at the emergence of the Second Polish Republic in 1918 and throughout the 20th century, Kraków reaffirmed its role as a major national academic and artistic centre. As of 2022, the city has a population of 800,653, with approximately 8 million additional people living within a  radius of its main square.

After the invasion of Poland by Nazi Germany at the start of World War II, the newly defined Distrikt Krakau (Kraków District) became the capital of Germany's General Government. The Jewish population of the city was forced into a walled zone known as the Kraków Ghetto, from where they were sent to Nazi extermination camps such as the nearby Auschwitz, and Nazi concentration camps like Płaszów. However, the city was spared from destruction and major bombing.

In 1978, Karol Wojtyła, archbishop of Kraków, was elevated to the papacy as Pope John Paul II—the first non-Italian pope in 455 years. Also that year, UNESCO approved Kraków's entire Old Town and historic centre and the nearby Wieliczka Salt Mine as Poland's first World Heritage Sites. Kraków is classified as a global city with the ranking of "high sufficiency" by the Globalization and World Cities Research Network. Its extensive cultural heritage across the epochs of Gothic, Renaissance and Baroque architecture includes Wawel Cathedral and Wawel Royal Castle on the banks of the Vistula, St. Mary's Basilica, Saints Peter and Paul Church and the largest medieval market square in Europe, Rynek Główny. Kraków is home to Jagiellonian University, one of the oldest universities in the world and traditionally Poland's most reputable institution of higher learning. The city also hosts a number of institutions of national significance such as the National Museum, Kraków Opera, Juliusz Słowacki Theatre, National Stary Theatre and the Jagiellonian Library. The city is served by John Paul II International Airport, the country's second busiest airport and the most important international airport for the inhabitants of south-eastern Poland.

In 2000, Kraków was named European Capital of Culture. In 2013, Kraków was officially approved as a UNESCO City of Literature. The city hosted World Youth Day in July 2016. In 2023, the third edition of the European Games will be held by Kraków and the Lesser Poland region.

Etymology
The name of Kraków is traditionally derived from Krakus (Krak, Grakch), the legendary founder of Kraków and a ruler of the tribe of Vistulans. In Polish,  is an archaic possessive form of Krak and essentially means "Krak's (town)". The true origin of the name is highly disputed among historians, with many theories in existence and no unanimous consensus. The first recorded mention of Prince Krakus (then written as Grakch) dates back to 1190, although the town existed as early as the seventh century, when it was inhabited by the tribe of Vistulans. It is possible that the name of the city is derived from the word "kruk", meaning crow or raven.

In English, a person born or living in Kraków is a Cracovian ( or krakus). Up through the 1990s the English version of the name was often written as Cracow, but now the most widespread modern English version is Krakow.

History

Kraków's early history begins with evidence of a Stone Age settlement on the present site of the Wawel Hill. A legend attributes Kraków's founding to the mythical ruler Krakus, who built it above a cave occupied by a dragon, Smok Wawelski. The first written record of the city's name dates back to 965, when Kraków was described as a notable commercial centre controlled first by Moravia (876–879), but captured by a Bohemian duke Boleslaus I in 955. The first acclaimed ruler of Poland, Mieszko I, took Kraków from the Bohemians and incorporated it into the holdings of the Piast dynasty towards the end of his reign.

In 1038, Kraków became the seat of the Polish government. By the end of the tenth century, the city was a leading centre of trade. Brick buildings were constructed, including the Royal Wawel Castle with St. Felix and Adaukt Rotunda, Romanesque churches such as St. Andrew's Church, a cathedral, and a basilica. The city was sacked and burned during the Mongol invasion of 1241. It was rebuilt practically identical, based on new location act and incorporated in 1257 by the high duke Bolesław V the Chaste who following the example of Wrocław, introduced city rights modelled on the Magdeburg law allowing for tax benefits and new trade privileges for the citizens. In 1259, the city was again ravaged by the Mongols. A third attack in 1287 was repelled thanks in part to the newly built fortifications.

In 1335, King Casimir III the Great (Kazimierz in Polish) declared the two western suburbs to be a new city named after him, Kazimierz (Casimiria in Latin). The defensive walls were erected around the central section of Kazimierz in 1362, and a plot was set aside for the Augustinian order next to Skałka. The city rose to prominence in 1364, when Casimir founded the University of Kraków, the second oldest university in central Europe after the Charles University in Prague. Casimir also began work on a campus for the academy in Kazimierz, but he died in 1370 and the campus was never completed.

The city continued to grow under the joint Lithuanian-Polish Jagiellon dynasty. As the capital of the Kingdom of Poland and a member of the Hanseatic League, the city attracted many craftsmen from abroad, businesses, and guilds as science and the arts began to flourish. The royal chancery and the university ensured a first flourishing of Polish literary culture in the city.

Kraków's "Golden Age"
The 15th and 16th centuries were known as Poland's Złoty Wiek or Golden Age. Many works of Polish Renaissance art and architecture were created, including ancient synagogues in Kraków's Jewish quarter located in the north-eastern part of Kazimierz, such as the Old Synagogue. During the reign of Casimir IV, various artists came to work and live in Kraków, and Johann Haller established a printing press in the city after Kasper Straube had printed the Calendarium Cracoviense, the first work printed in Poland, in 1473.

In 1520, the most famous church bell in Poland, named Zygmunt after Sigismund I of Poland, was cast by Hans Behem. At that time, Hans Dürer, a younger brother of artist and thinker Albrecht Dürer, was Sigismund's court painter. Hans von Kulmbach made altarpieces for several churches. In 1553, the Kazimierz district council gave the Jewish Qahal (council of a Jewish self-governing community) a licence for the right to build their own interior walls across the western section of the already existing defensive walls. The walls were expanded again in 1608 due to the growth of the community and influx of Jews from Bohemia. In 1572, King Sigismund II, the last of the Jagiellons, died childless. The Polish throne passed to Henry III of France and then to other foreign-based rulers in rapid succession, causing a decline in the city's importance that was worsened by pillaging during the Swedish invasion and by an outbreak of bubonic plague that left 20,000 of the city's residents dead. In 1596, Sigismund III of the House of Vasa moved the administrative capital of the Polish–Lithuanian Commonwealth from Kraków to Warsaw.

19th century

Already weakened during the 18th century, by the mid-1790s the Polish–Lithuanian Commonwealth had twice been partitioned by its neighbors: Russia, the Habsburg empire and Prussia. In 1791, the Austrian and Holy Roman Emperor Joseph II changed the status of Kazimierz as a separate city and made it into a district of Kraków. The richer Jewish families began to move out. However, because of the injunction against travel on the Sabbath, most Jewish families stayed relatively close to the historic synagogues. In 1794, Tadeusz Kościuszko initiated an unsuccessful insurrection in the town's Main Square which, in spite of his victorious Battle of Racławice against a numerically superior Russian army, resulted in the third and final partition of Poland. In 1809, Napoleon Bonaparte captured former Polish territories from Austria and made the town part of the Duchy of Warsaw. Following Napoleon's defeat, the 1815 Congress of Vienna restored the pre-war boundaries but also created the partially independent Free City of Kraków. An insurrection in 1846 failed, resulting in the city being annexed by Austria under the name the Grand Duchy of Kraków.

In 1866, Austria granted a degree of autonomy to Galicia after its own defeat in the Austro-Prussian War. Politically freer Kraków became a Polish national symbol and a centre of culture and art, known frequently as the "Polish Athens". Many leading Polish artists of the period resided in Kraków, among them the seminal painter Jan Matejko, laid to rest at Rakowicki Cemetery, and the founder of modern Polish drama, Stanisław Wyspiański. Fin de siècle Kraków evolved into a modern metropolis; running water and electric streetcars were introduced in 1901, and between 1910 and 1915, Kraków and its surrounding suburban communities were gradually combined into a single administrative unit called Greater Kraków.

At the outbreak of World War I on 3 August 1914, Józef Piłsudski formed a small cadre military unit, the First Cadre Company—the predecessor of the Polish Legions—which set out from Kraków to fight for the liberation of Poland. The city was briefly besieged by Russian troops in November 1914. Austrian rule in Kraków ended in 1918 when the Polish Liquidation Committee assumed power.

20th century to the present

Following the emergence of the Second Polish Republic in 1918, Kraków resumed its role as a major Polish academic and cultural centre, with the establishment of new universities such as the AGH University of Science and Technology and the Jan Matejko Academy of Fine Arts, including a number of new and essential vocational schools. The city became an important cultural centre for Polish Jews, including both Zionist and Bundist groups. Kraków was also an influential centre of Jewish spiritual life, with all its manifestations of religious observance - from Orthodox to Hasidic and Reform Judaism - flourishing side by side.

Following the invasion of Poland by Nazi Germany in September 1939, the city of Kraków became part of the General Government, a separate administrative region of the Third Reich. On 26 October 1939, the Nazi régime set up Distrikt Krakau, one of a total of four districts within the General Government. On the same day, the city of Kraków also became the capital of the administration. The General Government was ruled by Governor-General Hans Frank, who was based in the city's Wawel Castle. The Nazis envisioned turning Kraków into a completely Germanised city; after removal of all the Jews and Poles, renaming of locations and streets into the German language, and sponsorship of propaganda trying to portray it as a historically German city. On 28 November 1939 Hans Frank set up Judenräte (Jewish Councils) to be run by Jewish citizens for the purpose of carrying out orders for the Nazis. These orders included the registration of all Jewish people living in each area, the collection of taxes, and the formation of forced-labour groups. The Polish Home Army maintained a parallel underground administrative system.

On the eve of World War II some 56,000 Jews resided in Krakow, almost one-quarter of a total population of about 250,000. By November 1939, the Jewish population of Krakow had grown to approximately 70,000. According to German statistics from 1940, over 200,000 Jews lived within the entire Kraków District, comprising more than 5 percent of the total population in the district. These statistics, however, probably underestimate the situation.

In November 1939, during an operation known as "", the Germans arrested more than 180 university professors and academics and sent them to the Sachsenhausen and Dachau concentration camps, though the survivors were later released on the request of prominent Italians.

Before the formation of ghettos, which began in the Distrikt in December 1939, Jews were encouraged to flee the city. For those who remained the German authorities decided in March 1941 to allocate a then suburban neighborhood,  Podgórze District, to become Kraków's ghetto - there many Jews would die of illness or starvation. Initially, most ghettos were open and Jews were allowed to enter and exit freely. However, with time ghettos were generally closed and security became tighter. From autumn 1941, the SS developed the policy of Extermination through labour, which further worsened the already bleak conditions for Jews. The ghetto inhabitants were later murdered or sent to German Extermination camps, including Bełżec and Auschwitz, and to Kraków-Płaszów concentration camp. The largest deportations within the Distrikt occurred from June to September 1942. More specifically, the Kraków ghetto deportation occurred in the first week of June 1942, and in March 1943 the ghetto was definitely liquidated.

Roman Polanski, the film director, survived the Kraków ghetto. Oskar Schindler selected employees from the ghetto to work in his enamelware factory  ( for short), saving them from the camps. Similarly, many men capable of physical labor were saved from the deportations to extermination camps and instead sent to labor camps across the General Government. By September 1943, the last of the Jews from the Kraków ghetto had been deported. Although looted by occupational authorities, Kraków remained relatively undamaged at the end of World War II, with most of the city's historical and architectural legacy spared. Soviet forces under the command of Marshal Ivan Konev entered the city on 18 January 1945, and began arresting Poles loyal to the Polish government-in-exile or those who had served in the Home Army.

After the war, under the Polish People's Republic (officially declared in 1952), the intellectual and academic community of Kraków came under complete political control. The universities were soon deprived of printing rights and autonomy. The Stalinist government of Poland ordered the construction of the country's largest steel mill in the newly created suburb of Nowa Huta. The creation of the giant Lenin Steelworks (now Sendzimir Steelworks owned by Mittal) sealed Kraków's transformation from a university city into an industrial centre. The new working-class population, drawn by the industrialization of Kraków, contributed to rapid growth.

In an effort that spanned two decades, Karol Wojtyła, cardinal archbishop of Kraków from 1964 to 1978, successfully lobbied for permission to build the first churches in the newly-industrial suburbs. In 1978 the Catholic Church elevated Wojtyła to the papacy as John Paul II, the first non-Italian pope in 455 years. In the same year, UNESCO, following the application of local authorities, placed Kraków Old Town on the first-ever list of World Heritage Sites.

Geography

There are five nature reserves in Kraków, with a combined area of ca. . Due to their ecological value, these areas are legally protected. The western part of the city, along its northern and north-western side, borders an area of international significance known as the Jurassic Bielany-Tyniec refuge. The main motives for the protection of this area include plant and animal wildlife and the area's geomorphological features and landscape. Another part of the city is located within the ecological 'corridor' of the Vistula River valley. This corridor is also assessed as being of international significance as part of the Pan-European ecological network. The city centre is situated on the left (northern) bank of the river.

Climate

Officially, Kraków has a temperate oceanic climate, denoted by Köppen classification as Cfb, best defined as a semicontinental climate. In older reference periods it was classified as a warm summer continental climate (Dfb). By classification of Wincenty Okołowicz, it has a warm temperate climate in the centre of continental Europe with the "fusion" of different features.

Due to its geographic location, the city may be under marine influence, sometimes Arctic influence, but without direct influence, giving the city variable meteorological conditions over short spaces of time.

Being towards Eastern Europe and a relatively considerable distance from the sea, Krakow has significant temperature differences according to the progress of different air masses, having four defined seasons of the year.

In relation to Warsaw, temperatures are very similar for most of the year, except that in the colder months southern Poland has a larger daily temperature range, more moderate winds, generally more rainy days and with greater chances of clear skies on average, especially in winter. The higher sun angle also allows for a longer growing season. In addition, for older data there was less sun than the capital of the country, about 30 minutes daily per year, but both have small differences in relative humidity and the direction of the winds is northeast.

The climate table below presents weather data from 2000 to 2012, although the official Köppen reference period was from 1981 to 2010 (therefore not being technically a climatological normal). According to ongoing measurements, the temperature has increased during these years as compared with the last series.

Cityscape

Developed over many centuries, Kraków provides a showcase setting for many historic styles of architecture. As the city expanded, so too did the architectural achievements of its builders. It is for this reason that the variations in style and urban planning are so easily recognisable.

Built from its earliest nucleus outward, and having escaped much of the destruction endured by Poland during the 20th-century wars, Kraków's many architectural monuments can typically be seen in historical order by walking from the city centre out, towards its later districts. Kraków is one of the few medieval towns in Poland that does not have a historic Ratusz town hall in its Main Square, because it has not survived the Partitions of Poland.

Kraków's historic centre, which includes the Old Town, Kazimierz and the Wawel Castle, was included as the first of its kind on the list of UNESCO World Heritage Sites in 1978. The Stare Miasto is the most prominent example of an old town in the country. For many centuries Kraków was the royal capital of Poland, until Sigismund III Vasa relocated the court to Warsaw in 1596. The whole district is bisected by the Royal Road, the coronation route traversed by the Kings of Poland. The Route begins at St. Florian's Church outside the northern flank of the old city-walls in the medieval suburb of Kleparz; passes the Barbican of Kraków (Barbakan) built in 1499, and enters Stare Miasto through the Florian Gate. It leads down Floriańska Street through the Main Square, and up Grodzka to Wawel, the former seat of Polish royalty, overlooking the Vistula river. Old Town attracts visitors from all over the World. Kraków historic centre is one of the 13 places in Poland that are included in the UNESCO World Heritage Sites. The architectural design of the district had survived all cataclysms of the past and retained its original form coming from the medieval times.

In addition to the old town, the city's district of Kazimierz is particularly notable for its many renaissance buildings and picturesque streets, as well as the historic Jewish quarter located in the north-eastern part of Kazimierz. Kazimierz was founded in the 14th century to the south-east of the city centre and soon became a wealthy, well-populated area where construction of imposing properties became commonplace. Perhaps the most important feature of medieval Kazimierz was the only major, permanent bridge (Pons Regalis) across the northern arm of the Vistula. This natural barrier used to separate Kazimierz from the Old Town for several centuries, while the bridge connected Kraków to the Wieliczka Salt Mine and the lucrative Hungarian trade route. The last structure at this location (at the end of modern Stradom Street) was dismantled in 1880 when the northern arm of the river was filled in with earth and rock, and subsequently built over.

By the 1930s, Kraków had 120 officially registered synagogues and prayer houses that spanned across the old city. Much of Jewish intellectual life had moved to new centres like Podgórze. This in turn, led to the redevelopment and renovation of much of Kazimierz and the development of new districts in Kraków. Most historic buildings in central Kazimierz today are preserved in their original form. Some old buildings, however, were not repaired after the devastation brought by the Second World War, and have remained empty. Most recent efforts at restoring the historic neighborhoods gained new impetus around 1993. Kazimierz is now a well-visited area, seeing a booming growth in Jewish-themed restaurants, bars, bookstores and souvenir shops.

As the city of Kraków began to expand further under the rule of the Austro-Hungarian Empire, the new architectural styles also developed. Key buildings from the 19th and early 20th centuries in Kraków include the Jan Matejko Academy of Fine Arts, the directorate of the Polish State Railways as well as the original complex of Kraków Główny railway station and the city's Academy of Economics. It was also at around that time that Kraków's first radial boulevards began to appear, with the city undergoing a large-scale program aimed at transforming the ancient Polish capital into a sophisticated regional centre of the Austro-Hungarian Empire. New representative government buildings and multi-story tenement houses were built at around that time. Much of the urban-planning beyond the walls of the Old Town was done by Polish architects and engineers trained in Vienna. Some major projects of the era include the development of the Jagiellonian University's new premises and the building of the Collegium Novum just west of the Old Town. The imperial style planning of the city's further development continued until the return of Poland's independence, following the First World War. Early modernist style in Kraków is represented by such masterpieces as the Palace of Art by Franciszek Mączyński and the 'House under the Globe'. Secession style architecture, which had arrived in Kraków from Vienna, became popular towards the end of the Partitions.

With Poland's regained independence came the major change in the fortunes of Kraków—now the second most important city of a sovereign nation. The state began to make new plans for the city development and commissioned a number of representative buildings. The predominant style for new projects was modernism with various interpretations of the art-deco style. Important buildings constructed in the style of Polish modernism include the Feniks 'LOT' building on Basztowa Street, the Feniks department store on the Main Square and the Municipal Savings Bank on Szczepański Square. The Józef Piłsudski house is also of note as a particularly good example of interwar architecture in the city.

After the Second World War, new government turned toward Soviet influence and the Stalinist monumentalism. The doctrine of Socialist realism in Poland, as in other countries of the People's Republics, was enforced from 1949 to 1956. It involved all domains of art, but its most spectacular achievements were made in the field of urban design. The guidelines for this new trend were spelled-out in a 1949 resolution of the National Council of Party Architects. Architecture was to become a weapon in establishing the new social order by the communists. The ideological impact of urban design was valued more than aesthetics. It aimed at expressing persistence and power. This form of architecture was implemented in the new industrial district of Nowa Huta with apartment blocks constructed according to a Stalinist blueprint, with repetitious courtyards and wide, tree-lined avenues.

Since the style of the Renaissance was generally regarded as the most revered in old Polish architecture, it was also used for augmenting Poland's Socialist national format. However, in the course of incorporating the principles of Socialist realism, there were quite a few deviations introduced by the communists. One of these was to more closely reflect Soviet architecture, which resulted in the majority of works blending into one another. From 1953, critical opinions in the Party were increasingly frequent, and the doctrine was given up in 1956 marking the end of Stalinism. The soc-realist centre of Nowa Huta is considered to be a meritorious monument of the times. This period in postwar architecture was followed by the mass-construction of large Panel System apartment blocks, most of which were built outside the city centre and thus do not encroach upon the beauty of the old or new towns. Some examples of the new style (e.g., Hotel Cracovia) recently listed as heritage monuments were built during the latter half of the 20th century in Kraków.

After the Revolutions of 1989 and the birth of the Third Republic in the latter half of the 20th century, a number of new architectural projects were completed, including the construction of large business parks and commercial facilities such as the Galeria Krakowska, or infrastructure investments like the Kraków Fast Tram. A good example of this would be the Manggha Museum of Japanese Art and Technology designed by Arata Isozaki, the 2007-built Pawilon Wyspiański 2000, which is used as a multi-purpose information and exhibition space, or the Małopolski Garden of Arts (Małopolski Ogród Sztuki), a multi-purpose exhibition and theatre complex located in the historic Old Town.

Parks and gardens

There are about 40 parks in Kraków including dozens of gardens and forests. Several, like the Planty Park, Botanical Garden, Zoological Garden, Royal Garden, Park Krakowski, Jordan Park and Błonia Park are located in the centre of the city; with Zakrzówek, Lasek Wolski forest, Strzelecki Park and Park Lotników (among others) in the surrounding districts. Parks cover about 318.5 hectares (787 acres, 1.2 sq mi) of the city.

The Planty Park is the best-known park in Kraków. It was established between 1822 and 1830 in place of the old city walls, forming a green belt around the Old Town. It consists of a chain of smaller gardens designed in various styles and adorned with monuments.

The Jordan Park founded in 1889 by Dr Henryk Jordan, was the first public park of its kind in Europe. The park built on the banks of the Rudawa river was equipped with running and exercise tracks, playgrounds, the swimming pool, amphitheatre, pavilions, and a pond for boat rowing and water bicycles. It is located on the grounds of a larger Kraków's Błonia Park. The less prominent Park Krakowski was founded in 1885 by Stanisław Rehman but has since been greatly reduced in size because of rapid real estate development. It was a popular destination point with many Cracovians at the end of the 19th century.

Environment
There are five nature reserves in Kraków with a total area of 48.6 ha (120 acres). Smaller green zones constitute parts of the Kraków-Częstochowa Upland Jurassic Landscape Parks' Board, which deals with the protection areas of the Polish Jura. Under its jurisdiction are: the Bielany-Tyniec Landscape Park (Park Bielańsko-Tyniecki), Tenczynek Landscape Park (Park Tencziński) and Kraków Valleys Landscape Park (Park Krajobrazowy Dolinki Krakowskie), with their watersheds. All natural reserves of the Polish Jura Chain are part of the CORINE biotopes programme due to their unique flora, fauna, geomorphology and landscape. The western part of Kraków constitutes the so-called Obszar Krakowski ecological network, including the ecological corridor of the Vistula river. The southern slopes of limestone hills provide conditions for the development of thermophilous vegetation, grasslands and scrubs.

The city is spaced along an extended latitudinal transect of the Vistula River Valley with a network of tributaries including its right tributary Wilga, and left: Rudawa, Białucha, Dłubnia and Sanka. The rivers and their valleys along with bodies of water are some of the most interesting natural wonders of Kraków.

Kraków and its environment, surrounded by mountains, suffer from Europe's dirtiest air pollution because of smog, caused by burning coal for heating, especially in winter.

Governance

The Kraków City Council has 43 elected members, one of whom is the mayor, or President of Kraków, elected every four years. The election of the City Council and of the local head of government, which takes place at the same time, is based on legislation introduced on 20 June 2002. The President of Kraków, re-elected for his fourth term in 2014, is Jacek Majchrowski. Several members of the Polish national Parliament (Sejm) are elected from the Kraków constituency. The city's official symbols include a coat of arms, a flag, a seal, and a banner.

The responsibilities of Kraków's president include drafting and implementing resolutions, enacting city bylaws, managing the city budget, employing city administrators, and preparing against floods and natural disasters. The president fulfills his duties with the help of the City Council, city managers and city inspectors. In the 1990s, the city government was reorganised to better differentiate between its political agenda and administrative functions. As a result, the Office of Public Information was created to handle inquiries and foster communication between city departments and citizens at large.

In 2000, the city government introduced a new long-term program called "Safer City" in cooperation with the Police, Traffic, Social Services, Fire, Public Safety, and the Youth Departments. Subsequently, the number of criminal offences dropped by 3 percent between 2000 and 2001, and the rate of detection increased by 1.4 percent to a total of 30.2 percent in the same period. The city is receiving help in carrying out the program from all educational institutions and the local media, including TV, radio and the press.

Districts

Kraków is divided into 18 administrative districts (dzielnica) or boroughs, each with a degree of autonomy within its own municipal government. Prior to March 1991, the city had been divided into four quarters which still give a sense of identity to Kraków – the towns of Podgórze, Nowa Huta, and Krowodrza which were amalgamated into the city of Kraków as it expanded, and the ancient town centre of Kraków itself.

The oldest neighborhoods of Kraków were incorporated into the city before the late-18th century. They include the Old Town (Stare Miasto), once contained within the city defensive walls and now encircled by the Planty park; the Wawel District, which is the site of the Royal Castle and the cathedral; Stradom and Kazimierz with its historic Jewish quarter, the latter originally divided into Christian and Jewish quarters; as well as the ancient town of Kleparz.

Major districts added in the 19th and 20th centuries include Podgórze, which until 1915, was a separate town on the southern bank of the Vistula, and Nowa Huta, east of the city centre, built after World War II.

Among the most notable historic districts of the city are: Wawel Hill, home to Wawel Castle and Wawel Cathedral, where many historic Polish kings are buried; the medieval Old Town, with its Main Market Square ( square); dozens of old churches and museums; the 14th-century buildings of the Jagiellonian University; and Kazimierz, the historical centre of Kraków's Jewish social and religious life.

The Old Town district of Kraków is home to about 6,000 historic sites and more than 2,000,000 works of art. Its rich variety of heritage architecture includes Romanesque (e.g., St. Andrew's Church, Kraków), Renaissance, Baroque and Gothic buildings. Kraków's palaces, churches, theatres and mansions display a great variety of color, architectural details, stained glass, paintings, sculptures, and furnishings.

In the Market Square stands the Gothic St. Mary's Basilica (Kościół Mariacki). It was rebuilt in the 14th-century and features the famous wooden altar (Altarpiece of Veit Stoss), the largest Gothic altarpiece in the world, carved by Veit Stoss. From the church's main tower a trumpet call (hejnał mariacki), is sounded every hour. The melody, which used to announce the opening and closing of city gates, ends unexpectedly in midstream. According to legend, the tune was played during the 13th-century Tatar invasion by a guard warning citizens against the attack. He was shot by an archer of the invading Tatar forces whilst playing, the bugle call breaking off at the moment he died. The story was recounted in a book published in 1928 called The Trumpeter of Krakow, by Eric P. Kelly, which won a Newbery Award.

The current divisions were introduced by the Kraków City Hall on 19 April 1995. Districts were assigned Roman numerals as well as the name: Stare Miasto (I), Grzegórzki (II), Prądnik Czerwony (III), Prądnik Biały (IV), Łobzów (V), Bronowice (VI), Zwierzyniec (VII), Dębniki (VIII), Łagiewniki-Borek Fałęcki (IX), Swoszowice (X), Podgórze Duchackie (XI), Bieżanów-Prokocim (XII), Podgórze (XIII), Czyżyny (XIV), Mistrzejowice (XV), Bieńczyce (XVI), Wzgórza Krzesławickie (XVII), and Nowa Huta (XVIII).

Economy

Kraków is one of Poland's most important economic centres and the economic hub of the Lesser Poland (Małopolska) region. Since the fall of communism, the private sector has been growing steadily. There are about 50 large multinational companies in the city, including Google, Uber, IBM, Shell, UBS, HSBC, Motorola, Aptiv, MAN, General Electric, ABB, Aon, Akamai, Cisco, Hitachi, Altria, Capgemini, and Sabre Holdings, along with other British, German and Scandinavian-based firms. The city is also the global headquarters for Comarch, an enterprise software house. Kraków is the second most-visited city in Poland (after Warsaw). According to the World Investment Report 2011 by the UN Conference for Trade and Development (UNCTAD), Kraków is also the most emergent city location for investment in global BPO projects (Business Process Outsourcing) in the world.

In 2011, the city budget, which is presented by the Mayor of Kraków on 15 November annually, has a projected revenue of 3,500,000,000 złoty. The primary sources of revenue were as follows: 14% from the municipal taxation on real estate properties and the use of amenities, 30% in transfers from the national budget, and 34% in state subsidies. Projected expenditures, totaling 3,520,000,000 złoty, included 21% in city development costs and 79% in city maintenance costs. Of the maintenance costs, as much as 39% were spent on education and childcare. The City of Kraków's development costs included; 41% toward construction of roads, transport, and communication (combined), and 25% for the city's infrastructure and environment. The city has a high bond credit rating, and some 60% of the population is under the age of 45.

Unity Tower was completed in 2020 after almost 30 years, creating a new business and residential centre. It is the tallest building in the city.

Entrepreneurship
Krakow has a long history of entrepreneurship, perhaps best reflected in the fact the most important square in the city is called the Main Market Square (Rynek Główny).

Startup community
Since the early 2000s a startup community has emerged in Krakow, In the early days the Krakow: Europe's Silicon Valley web page was the on line hub of the community. Most important now is the OMGKRK foundation and its Facebook group which has over 5000 members and acts as a community notice board for the startup community.

Entrepreneurs
 
Jan Thurzo, a Hungarian entrepreneur and mining engineer who was from 1477 an Alderman and later Mayor of Kraków. He established the Fugger–Thurzo company with Jakob Fugger. Fugger monopolised copper mining and trade in the Holy Roman Empire around 1500 and has been described as the richest man who has ever lived.

Michal Hornstein, born in Krakow, and graduate of a Krakow Business School, escaped from a Nazi death camp transport. He moved to Montreal in 1951 where he founded Federal Construction Ltd., a real estate company focussing on apartments and shopping centres. He was recognised as a major philanthropist in Montreal and supported the arts, education and medicine, for example with this Gift of Old Masters to the Montreal Museum of Fine Arts

Helena Rubinstein, born in Kraków, established the Helena Rubenstein inc. cosmetics company which was sold to Colgate Palmolive in 1973 for $142.3 million in stock and cash, and was said to be one of the world's richest women.

Janusz Filipiak established the successful IT company Comarch in 1993 which in 2018 employed 5500 people, and sponsors the Cracovia football team.

Piotr Wilam established the Pascal Publishing House, the internet portal Onet.pl and seed capital fund Innovation Nest.

Rafal Brzoska Rafal Brzoska is the founder and CEO of InPost, which went public in January 2021 raising $3 billion.

Knowledge and innovation community
Kraków is one of the co-location centres of Knowledge and Innovation Community (Sustainable Energy) of The European Institute of Innovation and Technology (EIT).

InnoEnergy is an integrated alliance of reputable organisations from the education, research and industry sectors. It was created based on long standing links of cooperation as well as the principles of excellence. The partners have jointly developed a strategy to tackle the weaknesses of the European innovation landscape in the field of sustainable energy.

Transport

Public transport is based on a fairly dense network of tram and bus routes operated by a municipal company, supplemented by a number of private minibus operators. Local trains connect some of the suburbs. The bulk of the city's historic area has been turned into a pedestrian zone with rickshaws and horse-drawn carriages; however, the trams run within a three-block radius. The historic means of transportation in the city can be examined at the Museum of Municipal Engineering in the Kazimierz district, with many old trams, cars and buses.

Railway connections are available to most Polish cities, e.g. Katowice, Częstochowa, Szczecin, Gdynia and Warsaw. International destinations include Bratislava, Budapest, Vienna, Prague, Berlin, Hamburg, Lviv, Kyiv, and Odessa (June–September). The main railway station is located just outside the Old Town District and is well-served by public transport.

Direct trains cover the route between Kraków Główny train station and the airport in 20 minutes. Kraków Airport served around 5,800,000 passengers in 2017.

In Autumn 2016 Poland's oldest Bicycle-sharing system was modernized and now offers 1,500 bikes at 150 stations under the name of Wavelo (pl), which is owned by BikeU of the French multinational company Egis.

Demographics

Kraków had a recorded population of 774,839 in 2019. Selected demographic indicators are presented in a table (below), compiled on the basis of only the population living in Kraków permanently. The larger metropolitan area of the city encompasses a territory in which (in 2010) 1,393,893 inhabitants live.

Already in the Middle Ages, the population of Kraków consisting of numerous ethnic groups, began to grow rapidly. It doubled between 1100 and 1300 from 5,000 to 10,000, and in 1400 counted 14,000 inhabitants. By 1550, the population of metropolitan Kraków was 18,000; although it decreased to 15,000 in the next fifty years due to calamity. By the early 17th century the Kraków population had reached 28,000 inhabitants.

In the historical 1931 census preceding World War II, 78.1% of Cracovians declared Polish as their primary language, with Yiddish or Hebrew at 20.9%, Ukrainian 0.4%, German 0.3%, and Russian 0.1%. The ravages of history have greatly reduced the percentage of ethnic minorities living in Kraków.

In the last two decades, Kraków has seen a large growth of immigrant population. In the 2002 census, only 0.25% of respondents living in the city declared a non-Polish nationality primarily Ukrainian and Russian. As of 2019, it was estimated that foreigners accounted for as much as 10% of the city's population, with Ukrainians being the most numerous group (between 11,000 and 50,000).

Population growth in Kraków since 1791

Religion

The metropolitan city of Kraków is known as the city of churches. The abundance of landmark, historic temples along with the plenitude of monasteries and convents earned the city a countrywide reputation as the "Northern Rome" in the past. The churches of Kraków comprise over 120 places of worship (2007) of which over 65 were built in the 20th century. More are still being added. In addition to Roman Catholicism, other denominations present include Jehovah's Witnesses, Mariavite Church, Polish Catholic Church, Polish Orthodox Church, Protestantism and Latter-Day Saints.

As of 2017, weekly Mass attendance in the Archdiocese of Krakow was 49.9 percent, above the national Polish average of 38.3 percent.

Kraków contains also an outstanding collection of monuments of Jewish sacred architecture unmatched anywhere in Poland. Kraków was an influential centre of Jewish spiritual life before the outbreak of World War II, with all its manifestations of religious observance from Orthodox to Hasidic and Reform flourishing side by side. There were at least 90 synagogues in Kraków active before the Nazi German invasion of Poland, serving its burgeoning Jewish community of 60,000–80,000 (out of the city's total population of 237,000), established since the early 12th century.

Most synagogues of Kraków were ruined during World War II by the Nazis who despoiled them of all ceremonial objects, and used them as storehouses for ammunition, firefighting equipment, as general storage facilities and stables. The post-Holocaust Jewish population of the city had dwindled to about 5,900 before the end of the 1940s. Poland was the only Eastern Bloc country to allow free Jewish aliyah (emigration to Israel) without visas or exit permits upon the conclusion of World War II. By contrast, Stalin forcibly kept Russian Jews in the Soviet Union, as agreed to in the Yalta Conference. In recent time, thanks to efforts of the local Jewish and Polish organisations including foreign financial aid from the American Jewish Joint Distribution Committee, many synagogues underwent major restorations and serve religious and tourist purposes.

Education

Kraków is a major centre of education. Twenty-four institutions of higher education offer courses in the city, with more than 200,000 students. Jagiellonian University, the oldest university in Poland and ranked by the Times Higher Education Supplement as the second-best university in the country, was founded in 1364 as Studium Generale and renamed in 1817 to commemorate the royal Jagiellonian dynasty of Poland and Lithuania. Its principal academic asset is the Jagiellonian Library, with more than 4 million volumes, including a large collection of medieval manuscripts like Copernicus' De Revolutionibus and the Balthasar Behem Codex. With 42,325 students (2005) and 3,605 academic staff, the Jagiellonian University is also one of the leading research centres in Poland. Famous historical figures connected with the university include Saint John Cantius, Jan Długosz, Nicolaus Copernicus, Andrzej Frycz Modrzewski, Jan Kochanowski, King John III Sobieski, Pope John Paul II and Nobel laureates Ivo Andrić and Wisława Szymborska.

AGH University of Science and Technology, established in 1919, is the largest technical university in Poland, with more than 15 faculties and student enrollment exceeding 30,000. It was ranked by the Polish edition of Newsweek as the best technical university in the country in 2004. During its 80-year history, more than 73,000 students graduated from AGH with master's or bachelor's degrees. Some 3,600 persons were granted the degree of Doctor of Science, and about 900 obtained the qualification of Habilitated Doctor.

Other institutions of higher learning include Academy of Music in Kraków first conceived as conservatory in 1888, one of the oldest and most prestigious conservatories in Central Europe and a major concert venue; Kraków University of Economics, established in 1925; Pedagogical University, in operation since 1946; Agricultural University of Kraków, offering courses since 1890 (initially as a part of Jagiellonian University); Academy of Fine Arts, the oldest Fine Arts Academy in Poland, founded by the Polish painter Jan Matejko; Ludwik Solski Academy for the Dramatic Arts; The Pontifical Academy of Theology; AGH University of Science and Technology and Krakow University of Technology, which has more than 37,000 graduates.

Scientific societies and their branches in Kraków conduct scientific and educational work in local and countrywide scale. The Academy of Learning, Krakow Scientific Society, Association of Law Students' Library of the Jagiellonian University, Polish Copernicus Society of Naturalists, Polish Geological Society, Polish Theological Society in Kraków, Polish Section of Institute of Electrical and Electronics Engineers and Polish Society for Synchrotron Radiation all have their main seats in Kraków.

Culture

Kraków was named the official European Capital of Culture for the year 2000 by the European Union. It is a major attraction for both local and international tourists, attracting nearly 13 million visitors a year. Major landmarks include the Main Market Square with St. Mary's Basilica and the Sukiennice Cloth Hall, the Wawel Castle, the National Art Museum, the Zygmunt Bell at the Wawel Cathedral, and the medieval St. Florian's Gate with the Barbican along the Royal Coronation Route. Kraków has 28 museums and public art galleries. Among them is the Czartoryski Museum featuring works by Leonardo da Vinci and Rembrandt as well as the EUROPEUM - European Culture Centre and the Archaeological Museum of Kraków whose collection highlights include the Zbruch Idol and the Bronocice Pot.

Museums and national art galleries

Kraków's 28 museums are separated into the national and municipal museums; the city also has a number of art collections and public art galleries. The National Museum, established in 1879, as well as the National Art Collection on Wawel Hill, are all accessible to the general public.

The National Art Collection is located at the Wawel, the former residence of three dynasties of Polish monarchs. Royal Chambers feature art, period furniture, Polish and European paintings, collectibles, and a major collection of 16th-century monumental Flemish tapestries. Wawel Treasury and Armoury features Polish royal memorabilia, jewels, applied art, and 15th- to 18th-century arms. The Wawel Eastern Collection features Turkish tents and military accessories. The National Museum holds the largest body of artworks in the country with collections consisting of several hundred thousand items kept in big part in the Main Building at Ul. 3 Maja, although there are eleven other separate divisions of the museum in the city, one of the most popular being The Gallery of the 19th Century Polish Art in Sukiennice with the collection of some of the best known paintings and sculptures of the Young Poland movement. The latest division called Europeum with Brueghel among a hundred Western European paintings was inaugurated in 2013.

Other notable museums in Kraków include the Manggha Museum of Japanese Art and Technology (at M. Konopnickiej 26), Stanisław Wyspiański Museum (at 11 Szczepanska St), Jan Matejko Manor House in Krzesławice, – a museum devoted to the master painter and his life, Emeryk Hutten Czapski Museum, and Józef Mehoffer Manor.

The Rynek Underground museum, under the main square, showcases Kraków's over 1,000-year history though its streets, activities and artifacts. The construction of the museum was preceded by extensive excavations which started in 2005 and, as more and more was found, continued eventually until 2010.

Krakil - Museum of illusions is a space where illusions meet scientific inventions and the arts: physics and optics are displayed together with artworks and classical riddles.

The Polish Aviation Museum, considered the world's eighth best aviation museum by CNN, features over 200 aircraft including a Sopwith Camel among other First World War biplanes; a comprehensive display of aero engines; and a complete collection of airplane types developed by Poland after 1945. Activities of smaller museums around Kraków and in the Lesser Poland region are promoted and supported by the Małopolska Institute of Culture; the Institute organises annual Małopolska Heritage Days. The Lenin Museum was open from 1954 to 1989.

Performing arts

The city has several famous theatres, including the Narodowy Stary Teatr (the National Old Theatre), the Juliusz Słowacki Theatre, the Bagatela Theatre, the Ludowy Theatre, and the Groteska Theatre of Puppetry, as well as the Opera Krakowska and Kraków Operetta. The city's principal concert hall and the home of the Kraków Philharmonic Orchestra is the Kraków Philharmonic (Filharmonia Krakowska) built in 1931.

Kraków hosts many annual and biannual artistic events, some of international significance such as the Misteria Paschalia (Baroque music), Sacrum-Profanum (contemporary music), the Krakow Screen Festival (popular music), the Festival of Polish Music (classical music), Dedications (theatre), the Kraków Film Festival (one of Europe's oldest short films events), Etiuda&Anima International Film Festival (the oldest international art-film event in Poland), Biennial of Graphic Arts, and the Jewish Culture Festival. Kraków was the residence of two Polish Nobel laureates in literature, Wisława Szymborska and Czesław Miłosz; a third Nobel laureate, the Yugoslav writer Ivo Andric, lived and studied in Kraków. Other former longtime residents include internationally renowned Polish film directors Andrzej Wajda and Roman Polanski, both of whom are Academy Award winners.

Music

Opera Krakowska one of the leading national opera companies, stages 200 performances each year including ballet, operettas and musicals. It has, in its main repertoire, the greatest world and Polish opera classics. The Opera moved into its first permanent House in the autumn of 2008. It is in charge also of the Summer Festival of Opera and Operetta.

Kraków is home to two major Polish festivals of early music presenting forgotten Baroque oratorios and operas: Opera Rara, and Misteria Paschalia. Meanwhile, Capella Cracoviensis runs the Music in Old Krakow International Festival.

Academy of Music in Kraków, founded in 1888, is known worldwide as the alma mater of the contemporary Polish composer Krzysztof Penderecki and it is also the only one in Poland to have two winners of the International Chopin Competition in Warsaw among its alumni. The academy organises concerts of its students and guests throughout the whole year.

Music organisations and venues include: Kraków Philharmonic, Sinfonietta Cracovia (a.k.a. the Orchestra of the Royal City of Kraków), the Polish Radio Choir of Kraków, Organum Academic Choir, the Mixed Mariański Choir (Mieszany Chór Mariański), Kraków Academic Choir of the Jagiellonian University, the Kraków Chamber Choir, Amar Corde String Quartet, Consortium Iagellonicum Baroque Orchestra of the Jagiellonian University, Brass Band of T. Sendzimir Steelworks, and Camerata Chamber Orchestra of Radio Kraków.

Tourism
According to official statistics, in 2019 Kraków was visited by over 14 million tourists including 3.3 million foreign travellers. The visitors spent over 7.5 billion zlotys (ca. €1.7 billion) in the city (without travel costs and pre-booked accommodation). Most foreign tourists came from Germany (14.2%), United Kingdom (13.9%), Italy (11.5%), France (11.2%), Spain (10.4%) and Ukraine (5.4%). The Kraków tour-guide from the Lesser Poland Visitors Bureau indicated that not all statistics are recorded due to the considerable number of those who come, staying in readily available private rooms paid for by cash, especially from Eastern Europe.

The main reasons for visiting the city are: its historical monuments, recreation as well as relatives and friends (placing third in the ranking), religion and business. There are 120 quality hotels in Kraków (usually about half full) offering 15,485 overnight accommodations. The average stay last for about 4 to 7 nights. The survey conducted among the travelers showed that they enjoyed the city's friendliness most, with 90% of Polish tourists and 87% foreigners stating that they would recommend visiting it. Notable points of interest outside the city include the Wieliczka salt mine, the Tatra Mountains  to the south, the historic city of Częstochowa (north-west), the well-preserved former Nazi concentration camp at Auschwitz, and Ojcowski National Park, which includes the Renaissance Castle at Pieskowa Skała. Kraków has been awarded a number of top international rankings such as the 1st place in the Top city-break destinations 2014 survey conducted by the British consumer association Which?.

Sports

Kraków was the host city of the 2014 FIVB Men's Volleyball World Championship and 2016 European Men's Handball Championship. It has also been selected as the European City of Sport for 2014.

Football is one of the most popular sports in the city. The two teams with the largest following are thirteen-time Polish champion Wisła Kraków, and five-time champion Cracovia, both founded in 1906 as the oldest still existing in Poland. They have been involved in the most intense rivalry in the country and one of the most intense in all of Europe, known as the Holy War. Other football clubs include Hutnik Kraków, Wawel Kraków, and one-time Polish champion Garbarnia Kraków. There is also the first-league rugby club Juvenia Kraków. Kraków has a number of additional, equally valued sports teams including twelve-time Polish ice hockey champions Cracovia and the twenty-time women's basketball champions Wisła Kraków.

The Cracovia Marathon, with thousands of participants from two dozen countries annually, has been held in the city since 2002. Poland's first F1 racing driver Robert Kubica was born and brought up in Kraków, as was former WWE tag team champion Ivan Putski, and Top 10 ranked women's tennis player Agnieszka Radwańska.

The construction of a new Tauron Arena Kraków began in May 2010; for concerts, indoor athletics, hockey, basketball, futsal and other events. The facility area has 61,434 m2, with maximum area of the arena court of 4 546 m2. The average capacity is 18,000 for concerts, and 15,000 for sport events, with maximum number of spectators being 22,000. The Arena boasts Poland's largest LED media façade, with a total surface of 5,200 m2 of LED strip lighting, wrapping around the stadium, and one of Europe's largest LED screens, measuring over 540 m2.

Kraków was bidding to host the 2022 Winter Olympics with Jasná but the bid was rejected by a majority (69.72%) of the vote in a referendum on 16 May 2014. The referendum was organised after a wave of criticism from citizens who believed that the Olympics would not promote the city. The organizing committee of "Krakow 2022" spent almost $40,000 to pay for a citizen-approved logo, but many citizens considered this a waste of public money. The committee was rumoured to have fraudulently used several million zlotys for unknown expenses.

In May 2019, the Polish Olympic Committee announced Kraków as host of the Polish bid for the 2023 European Games, On 22 June 2019, The European Olympic Committees at the General Assembly in Minsk, Belarus announced that Kraków will host the 2023 edition.

Notable people

International relations

Contemporary foreign names for the city
Kraków is referred to by various names in different languages. An old English name for the city is Cracow; though it has become less common in recent decades, some sources still use it.

Twin towns and sister cities
Kraków is twinned, or maintains close relations, with 36 cities around the world:

  Batu, Indonesia (2000)
  Bordeaux, France (1993)
  Bratislava, Slovakia
  Budapest, Hungary (2005)
  Cambridge, Massachusetts, US (1989)
  Curitiba, Brazil (1993)
  Cusco, Peru
  Edinburgh, Scotland (1995)
  Fes, Morocco (2004)
  Florence, Italy (1992)
  Frankfurt, Germany (1991)
  Göteborg, Sweden (1990)
  Guadalajara, Mexico
  Innsbruck, Austria (1998)
  Kyiv, Ukraine (1993)
  La Serena, Chile (1995)
  Leipzig, Germany (1995)
  Leuven, Belgium (1991)
  Lviv, Ukraine (1995)
  Malang, Indonesia (1997)
  Milan, Italy (2003)
  Nuremberg, Germany (1991)
  Orléans, France (1992)
  Pécs, Hungary (1998)
  Quito, Ecuador
  Rochester, New York, US (1973)
  Liège, Belgium (1978)
  Rome, Italy
  San Francisco, US (2009)  Seville, Spain (2002)  Solothurn, Switzerland (1990)  Split, Croatia
  Tbilisi, Georgia
  Veliko Tarnovo, Bulgaria (1975)  Vilnius, Lithuania
  Zagreb, Croatia (1975)See also

 Cracow Circle Thomism
 Tourism in Poland

 References 

Bibliography
 
 Jane Hardy, Al Rainnie, Restructuring Krakow: Desperately Seeking Capitalism. Published 1996 by Mansell Publishing, 285 pages. Business, economics, finance. .
 Edward Hartwig, Kraków, with Jerzy Broszkiewicz (contributor). Published 1980, by Sport i Turystyka, 239 pages. .
 Bolesław T. Łaszewski, Kraków: karta z dziejów dwudziestolecia. Published 1985, by Bicentennial Pub. Corp. (original from the University of Michigan), 132 pages. 
 
 Joanna Markin, Bogumiła Gnypowa, Kraków: The Guide. Published 1996 by Pascal Publishing, 342 pages. .
 Tim Pepper, Andrew Beattie, Krakow. Published 2007 by Hunter Pub Inc., 160 pages. . The book includes description of public art galleries and museums.
 Scott Simpson, Krakow. Published 2003 by Thomas Cook Publishing, 192 pages. Transport, geography, sightseeing, history, and culture. Includes weblinks CD. .
 
 Dorota Wąsik, Emma Roper-Evans, Krakow. Published 2002 by Somerset. Cultural guidebook series, 160 pages. .
 Richard Watkins, Best of Kraków'', Published 2006, by Lonely Planet, 64 pages, complemented by fold-out maps. .

External links

 
 Protect Kraków Heritage Campaign
 krakowmiasto.pl 
 Jewish Community in Kraków on Virtual Shtetl
 
 Map: Kraków Heritage Under Threat
 Municipal spatial information system – GIS maps of Kraków 
 Cultural heritage of Kraków (in yellow on city map)
 Kraków old map from 1785 year
 Beatniks and Beyond: An Alternative Guide to Kraków
 Things to do in Kraków 
 Interesting places to visit in Kraków
 10 must-see things in Krakow
 Krakow.wiki – biggest knowledge base about Krakow in English
 Must See Attractions & Activities in Krakow

 
City counties of Poland
Cities and towns in Lesser Poland Voivodeship
Former capitals of Poland
Kraków Voivodeship (14th century – 1795)
Free City of Kraków
Kingdom of Galicia and Lodomeria
Kraków Voivodeship (1919–1939)
Historic Jewish communities
World Heritage Sites in Poland
Members of the Hanseatic League
Magdeburg rights
Holocaust locations in Poland